The Wheatland Railway Inc. is a Canadian short line railway company operating on trackage in Saskatchewan, Canada.  Wheatland Rail is owned by six north central Saskatchewan municipalities.  The railway leases former Canadian National Railway tracks.  The Wheatland Railway utilizes Great Sandhills staff and locomotives.

References

Saskatchewan railways